Predrag Sarić (24 June 1921 – 16 October 1979) was a Croatian rower. He competed in the men's coxed pair event at the 1948 Summer Olympics.

References

1921 births
1979 deaths
Croatian male rowers
Olympic rowers of Yugoslavia
Rowers at the 1948 Summer Olympics
People from Požega-Slavonia County